ACATS may refer to:

 Ada Conformity Assessment Test Suite, the test suite used for Ada processor conformity testing
 Advisory Committee on Advanced Television Services of the US Federal Communications Commission
 Automated Customer Account Transfer Service, commonly known as ACATS, a system developed by the National Securities Clearing Corporation (NSCC) that executes the transfer of securities from a trading account at one financial institution to a trading account at another